Virgil Mărdărescu (also known as "Gil Mărdărescu", "Gheorge Mărdărescu" and "Vintilă Mărdărescu"; 15 July 1921 – 11 June 2003) was a Romanian football manager.

In 1969, was appointed as manager of the Romania national "B" team, known as Romania Olympic and undertook a tour of Israel. and Australia.

In 1976, he led Morocco to their first Africa Cup of Nations title, but was unable to follow up that success in 1978 when the team were knocked out in the first round.

His son Gil Mărdărescu played together with Pelé for the New York Cosmos in the NASL.

Honours
Argeș Pitești
Romanian Cup runner-up: 1964–65

Politehnica Iași
Liga II: 1972–73

Morocco
Africa Cup of Nations: 1976
Pan Arab Games: 1976

References 

1921 births
2003 deaths
Romanian footballers
FC Petrolul Ploiești players
Romanian football managers
FC Universitatea Cluj managers
CSM Jiul Petroșani managers
CS Universitatea Craiova managers
ACF Gloria Bistrița managers
FCM Bacău managers
FC Argeș Pitești managers
FCV Farul Constanța managers
Romanian expatriate football managers
Romanian expatriate sportspeople in Morocco
Romanian expatriate sportspeople in the United States
Morocco national football team managers
1976 African Cup of Nations managers
1978 African Cup of Nations managers
Expatriate football managers in Morocco
Expatriate soccer managers in the United States
American Soccer League (1933–1983) coaches
Association footballers not categorized by position